Romorantin-Lanthenay, commonly known as Romorantin, is a commune and town in the Loir-et-Cher department, administrative region of Centre-Val de Loire, France.

It is the capital city of the natural region of Sologne.

History
The current commune is the result of the merger, on 29 May 1961, of the former communes of Romorantin and Lanthenay.

Transportation
Romorantin is served by the A85 autoroute and the TER Centre-Val de Loire regional rail network (Chemin de Fer du Blanc-Argent).

Population
The population data given in the table and graph below for 1954 and earlier refer to the former commune of Romorantin.

Personalities
 Martha Broissier was made famous around the year of 1578 for her feigned demonic possession.
 Nassira El Moaddem, journalist, TV presenter and writer.

Sites and tourism
The city hosts the Museum of Sologne. Sologne is a region in North-Central France, well known for its forest.

Sport
Between 6 July and 22 July 2007 Sologne Aerodrome was used for the Women's World Gliding Championships.

Romorantin was home to former French automobile firm Matra.

Every year during the last weekend in October, a gastronomy festival is held in Romorantin. First held in 1978, "Les Journées Gastronomiques de Sologne" now attracts around 13,000 visitors.

Davy Jeanney, a two-time winner in the World Rallycross Championship, lives in Romorantin-Lanthenay.

Twin towns
Romorantin-Lanthenay is twinned with:
 Long Eaton, United Kingdom
 Langen, Hesse, Germany
 Aranda de Duero, Castilla y León, Spain
 Hollywood, Florida, United States

See also
 Sologne
 Sauldre River
 SO Romorantin, association football team
 Stade Jules Ladoumègue, a stadium in Romorantin-Lanthenay

References

External links

 Official website 

Communes of Loir-et-Cher
Subprefectures in France
Orléanais